Martin Tobias Samuelsson (born January 25, 1982) is a Swedish ice hockey player who last played for the Malmö Redhawks of the Swedish Hockey League. He was drafted by the Boston Bruins in the first round, 27th overall, during the 2000 NHL Entry Draft.

Career statistics

Regular season and playoffs

International

External links

1982 births
Boston Bruins draft picks
Boston Bruins players
Linköping HC players
Living people
National Hockey League first-round draft picks
People from Upplands Väsby Municipality
Swedish ice hockey right wingers
Sportspeople from Stockholm County